Bystropogon  is a genus of evergreen shrubs in the family Lamiaceae. It is native to the Canary Islands and Madeira in the eastern Atlantic Ocean. Allied to the Origanum and Thymus, the genus is characterized by tiny flowers in much-branched clusters, with plume-like sepals that elongate at the fruiting stage, giving the whole tip of each branch a fuzzy appearance. Stems are square in cross-section and leaves, arranged in opposite pairs, are aromatic when crushed.

Cultivation  The plant prefers mild and dry climates. Grow in very well-drained soil in sunny position. Propagate from seed or cuttings.

Species
Many species names have been proposed for members of this genus, but most of them have been moved to other genera, particularly Clinopodium, Minthostachys, Cuminia, and Mesosphaerum. As currently constituted, the following are recognized in Bystropogon

 Bystropogon × beltraniae La Serna - Tenerife   (B. canariensis var. smithianus × B. plumosus) 
 Bystropogon canariensis (L.) L'Hér. - Canary Islands  
 Bystropogon maderensis Webb & Berthel. - Madeira 
 Bystropogon odoratissimus Bolle - Tenerife    
 Bystropogon origanifolius L'Hér. - Canary Islands  
 Bystropogon plumosus (L.f.) L'Hér. - Tenerife    
 Bystropogon punctatus  L'Hér. - Madeira 
 Bystropogon × schmitzii (Menezes) Menezes - Ribiero Frio in Madeira    (B. maderensis × B. punctatus) 
 Bystropogon × serrulatus Webb & Berthel - Gran Canaria   (B. canariensis × B. origanifolium var. canariae) 
 Bystropogon wildpretii La Serna - La Palma in the Canary Islands

References

Lord, Tony (2003) Flora : The Gardener's Bible : More than 20,000 garden plants from around the world. London: Cassell.  
Botanica Sistematica
:es:Bystropogon

Lamiaceae
Lamiaceae genera
Flora of the Canary Islands
Taxa named by Charles Louis L'Héritier de Brutelle